"Locomotion" is a song by English electronic band Orchestral Manoeuvres in the Dark (OMD), released on 2 April 1984 as the lead single from their fifth studio album, Junk Culture (1984). It was one of the band's biggest European hits, charting within the Top 5 in the UK, Ireland, Belgium and the Netherlands, while also peaking at No. 14 in Germany.

"Locomotion" has been included on every OMD singles and greatest hits compilation album.

Background
"Locomotion" was recorded during the last week of sessions at Montserrat before the drums were overdubbed at ICP Studios in Brussels. The original song was combined with a steel drum rhythm that Paul Humphreys had written the previous week and a bass line and piano that Gordian Troeller (the band's manager) contributed. The track was mixed and the brass added at Wisseloord Studios in the Netherlands; the brass arrangements were made by Tony Visconti. The song marries downcast lyrics with upbeat melodies.

Jean-Pierre Berckmans shot the official video. Taking advantage of where they were living at the time, the band filmed this video in Ostend and Brussels. Frontman Andy McCluskey recalled, "Funniest part of it was trying to look like we were on a Caribbean cruise in the middle of Ostend harbour at 2 in the morning on that sailing ship and you can see the hot air coming out as breath when I'm singing!" The Belgian model Anne Beyens appears in the video.

Live recordings of "Locomotion" have been issued on the 12" releases of the singles "La Femme Accident" (1985) "If You Leave" (1986) and the second CD single of "Everyday" (1993), as well as on the Architecture & Morality & More and Live in Berlin albums.

Reception
"Locomotion", which marked a move toward more pop-oriented material for OMD, faced initial criticism – notably on BBC Radio 1's Round Table show. Conversely, Tom Hibbert of Smash Hits felt it was a return to form after the commercially unsuccessful Dazzle Ships. He wrote, "Having failed to impress the world with songs about robots in Czechoslovakia, OMD return in a lighter vein [...] with no references whatsoever to genetic engineering. Pleasant." The North Wales Weekly News called the single "[OMD's] best since 'Enola Gay'." KROQ ranked it the 31st-greatest song of 1984.

Critic Dave Thompson praised "Locomotion" in a retrospective review for AllMusic, writing, "[E]verything about this number spells lightness: the breezy melody, the tootling synths, the giddy keyboards, and — best of all — the band's effervescent harmonies." Louder Than War journalist Paul Scott-Bates remarked, "In terms of a pop song, it borders classic – instantly recognisable from the first few seconds, a chorus that everyone knows and verses that were as memorable as choruses."

OMD's former Factory labelmate, Peter Hook, disapproved of the track, calling it a "dreadful offering". On the other hand, Barenaked Ladies drummer Tyler Stewart contemplated "Locomotion" as his favourite OMD song, describing it as "darn good".

B-sides
All formats featured "Her Body in My Soul" on the B-side. There is an additional track on the 12" vinyl and 3" CD singles, "The Avenue". Both songs can be found on the B-sides compilation album, Navigation: The OMD B-Sides (2001). "The Avenue" was the first song recorded at Montserrat and deals with the repetition of mistakes that people have made before you. The sample used in the song is taken from the Andrei Tarkovsky film Stalker (1979).

"The Avenue" was placed at no. 5 in Classic Pops "Top 20 B-sides of the 80s".

Track listings

7" vinyl
 UK: Virgin / VS 660, VSS 660 (shaped picture disc)
 West Germany: Virgin / 106 377
 USA: Virgin / AM-2671
 France:Virgin / 90115

12" vinyl
 UK: Virgin / VS 660-12
 France: Virgin / 80092
 USA: A&M Records / SP-12108

             

 Canada: Virgin / VDJ02 (promo)

3" CD
Released , Virgin / CDT 12.

Charts

Weekly charts

Year-end charts

References

External links
 Lyrics
 

1984 singles
Orchestral Manoeuvres in the Dark songs
1984 songs
Songs about trains
Virgin Records singles